Jean Frydman (26 June 1925 – 14 March 2021) was a Jewish member of the French Resistance during World War II and businessman. He received the Légion d'honneur in 2016 for his wartime efforts.

Resistance
During World War II, at the age of 15 he rallied the France libre (Free France). In the summer of 1944, he escaped from the deportation train that was taking him and many others from the Drancy internment camp to Buchenwald. One of the deportees in the same train car was Marcel Dassault. For his brave patriotism, he was bestowed the Légion d'honneur by the President François Hollande in May 2016.

Man of communication
He was among the first managers of radio station Europe 1 between 1957 and 1962; he headed Télé Monte Carlo, and was then director of the advertising agency Régie n°1. He was dubbed "the secret gardener of the French audiovisual sector".

Businessman
After having been forced to leave the Board of Paravision, audiovisual branch of L'Oréal, he revealed the past life of André Bettencourt during WW2, forcing him to express regrets about "past mistakes".

Politics
Since resisting the Nazis' control over France in his teens, Frydman spent his life following, advocating liberty and peace. That led him to become involved at the highest level of negotiation between Israel and Palestine, as he advised Shimon Peres, Yitzhak Rabin, and Ehud Barak. As such, he was instrumental in starting the Oslo Peace Accords. Frydman served as a member of the Advisory Board of the Israel Council on Foreign Relations.

Personal life 
Jean Frydman had six children, ten grandchildren, and was married to Daniela Frydman until his death. He was a friend of former French President Valéry Giscard d'Estaing, former Israeli President Shimon Peres, former Israeli Prime Minister Ehud Barak, and former IMF Managing Director Dominique Strauss-Kahn.

Frydman died in Savyon, Israel, on 14 March 2021, at the age of 95.

See also

 L'Oréal

References

External links 

  Élie Barnavi, "Jean Frydman, Tableaux d'une vie", 2008
  Jean-Pierre Chaline, « André Bettencourt (1919-2007) », dans Études normandes , 2008-1

1925 births
2021 deaths
Chevaliers of the Légion d'honneur
20th-century French businesspeople
French people of Polish-Jewish descent
French politicians
Jews in the French resistance
L'Oréal people